Playwrights from Canada include:

A 
 Marianne Ackerman
 Kawa Ada
 Evan Adams
 Carmen Aguirre
 André Alexis
 Hrant Alianak
 Martha Allan
 Anne-Marie Alonzo
 Karim Alrawi
 Janet Amos
 Debra Anderson
 Hugh Abercrombie Anderson
 John Murray Anderson
 Ben Antao
 Trey Anthony
 Salvatore Antonio
 Leslie Arden
 Anthony Armstrong
 Daniel Arnold
 Lawrence Aronovitch
 Nina Arsenault
 Damien Atkins
 Napoléon Aubin
 Suzanne Aubry
 Barry Avrich
 Caroline Azar

B 
 Bilal Baig
 Catherine Banks
 Keith Barker
 Jean Basile
 Mary Elizabeth Bayer
 Christine Beaulieu
 Victor-Lévy Beaulieu
 Charles William Bell
 Martin Bellemare
 John Bemrose
 Carolyn Bennett
 Janette Bertrand
 Lillian Beynon Thomas
 Yvan Bienvenue
 Geneviève Billette
 Nicolas Billon
 Marthe Blackburn
 Mark Blagrave
 William Rufus Blake
 Seymour Blicker
 Laurie Block
 Peter Blue Cloud
 Columpa Bobb
 Adam Bock
 Carol Bolt
 Yolanda Bonnell
 Walter Borden
 Gary Botting
 Michel Marc Bouchard
 Denise Boucher
 Pan Bouyoucas
 Gail Bowen
 Leah-Simone Bowen
 George Boyd
 Diana Braithwaite
 Ken Brand
 Marie Brassard
 Morwyn Brebner
 Baba Brinkman
 Fanny Britt
 Cecil Broadhurst
 Leanna Brodie
 Eve Brodlique
 Daniel Brooks
 Kenneth Brown
 Mark Brownell
 Walter Bruno
 Ronnie Burkett
 Aaron Bushkowsky
 Alec Butler

C 
 Chantal Cadieux
 Jason Cadieux
 Morley Callaghan
 George Frederick Cameron
 Silver Donald Cameron
 Dave Carley
 Franco Catanzariti
 Kate Cayley
 Catherine Chabot
 Rick Chafe
 Robert Chafe
 Anna Chatterton
 Normand Chaurette
 Martha Chaves
 Shirley Cheechoo
 Évelyne de la Chenelière
 Leah Cherniak
 Charly Chiarelli
 Herménégilde Chiasson
 Mary-Colin Chisholm
 Anne Chislett
 Ins Choi
 Olivier Choinière
 Sally Clark
 Cheril N. Clarke
 George Elliott Clarke
 Marie Clements
 Fabien Cloutier
 George Clutesi
 Lisa Codrington
 Joy Coghill
 Susan G. Cole
 Megan Gail Coles
 Kathryn Colquhoun
 Germaine Comeau
 Tom Cone
 Christopher Cook
 Michael Cook
 Beverley Cooper
 Charlotte Corbeil-Coleman
 Belinda Cornish
 Michel Côté
 Louise Cotnoir
 John Coulter
 Douglas Coupland
 Gracia Couturier
 Susan Coyne
 Archie Crail (Exile)
 Mark Crawford
 Seán Cummings
 Peter Cureton
 Colleen Curran
 Sheldon Currie
 Sarah Anne Curzon
 Eliza Lanesford Cushing
 May Cutler
 René Richard Cyr

D
 Jean-Marc Dalpé
 Joseph A. Dandurand
 Daniel Danis
 Jill Daum
 Robertson Davies
 TJ Dawe
 Tracy Dawson
 Claire Dé
 Mazo de la Roche
 Vincent de Tourdonnet
 Jeanne-Mance Delisle
 David Demchuk
 Sandra Dempsey
 Merrill Denison
 Charles Dennis
 Denise Desautels
 Peter Desbarats
 Aurore Dessureault-Descôteaux
 Claudia Dey
 Ned Dickens
 Dick Diespecker
 Dorothy Dittrich
 Emma Donoghue
 Catherine Dorion
 Chris Doty
 Clive Doucet
 Nathalie Doummar
 Bruce Dowbiggin
 Brian Drader
 Claire Drainie Taylor
 Don Druick
 Jasmine Dubé
 Marcel Dubé
 René-Daniel Dubois
 Réjean Ducharme
 Paul Dunn
 Louise Dupré
 Louisette Dussault
 Ted Dykstra

E 
 Chris Earle (Radio :30)
 Gwaai Edenshaw
 Mary Susanne Edgar
 Matthew Edison
 Caterina Edwards
 Tom Edwards
 Kris Elgstrand
 Cathy Elliott
 Richard Epp
 Josh Epstein
 Rose-Maïté Erkoreka
 Gloria Escomel
 Gérard Étienne
 Hubert Evans

F 
 Abla Farhoud
 David Fennario (Balconville, Joe Beef)
 Ian Ferguson
 Trevor Ferguson
 Timothy Findley (Elizabeth Rex, The Stillborn Lover)
 Lois Fine
 Larry Fineberg
 Thom Fitzgerald (Cloudburst)
 Diane Flacks
 Waawaate Fobister (Agokwe)
 Cheryl Foggo
 Dennis Foon (The Short Tree and the Bird That Could Not Sing)
 Honor Ford-Smith
 Norm Foster (Sinners, The Affections of May)
 Brad Fraser (Unidentified Human Remains and the True Nature of Love, Poor Super Man)
 Carole Fréchette
 Louis-Honoré Fréchette
 Pauline Fréchette
 David French (Leaving Home, Salt-Water Moon)
 William Fruet
 Robin Fulford (Steel Kiss, Whitewash)
 Janine Fuller

G 
 Linda Gaboriau
 Lorena Gale
 Brendan Gall
 Mavis Gallant
 Steve Galluccio
 Ken Garnhum
 Bill Gaston
 C. E. Gatchalian
 Jean-Rock Gaudreault
 Connie Gault
 Gratien Gélinas
 Jean-Claude Germain
 Samuel Gesser
 Melissa James Gibson
 Florence Gibson MacDonald
 Sky Gilbert
 Joanna Glass
 Gwethalyn Graham
 Rachel Graton
 Robert Gravel
 Carolyn Gray
 John MacLachlan Gray
 Jeff Green
 Nick Green
 Richard Greenblatt
 Brit Griffin
 Linda Griffiths
 Larry Guno
 David Gurr
 Paul Gury

H 
 Alexandria Haber
 Emma Haché
 Brigitte Haentjens
 Abby Hagyard
 Medina Hahn
 Jason Hall
 Jordan Hall
 Marie-Lynn Hammond
 Don Hannah
 Herschel Hardin
 Allana Harkin
 Don Harron
 Kim Senklip Harvey
 Elliott Hayes
 Michael Healey
 Charles Heavysege
 Marie-Francine Hébert
 Terence Heffernan
 David Hein
 Matthew Heiti
 Tom Hendry
 Kate Hennig
 John Herbert
 Catherine Hernandez
 Kate Hewlett
 Tomson Highway
 Brian Hill
 John Stephen Hill (Steve Hill)
 Ernest Hillen
 Karen Hines
 Susan Holbrook
 Arthur Holden
 Norah M. Holland
 Margaret Hollingsworth
 Michael Hollingsworth
 Hilda Mary Hooke
 Raymond Hull
 J. Timothy Hunt
 Maureen Hunter
 Joel Thomas Hynes

I 
 John Ibbitson
 Neamat Imam
 Anosh Irani
 Steve Ivings

J 
 Donald Jack
 Ted Johns
 Becky Johnson
 Terry Jordan
 Patricia Joudry

K 
 Hiro Kanagawa
 Margo Kane
 M. J. Kang
 Greg Kearney
 Jillian Keiley
 Adam Kelly
 M. T. Kelly
 Olivier Kemeid
 Kevin Kerr
 Paul Kimball
 Deborah Kimmett
 Gary Klang
 Robert Knuckle
 Andrew Kooman
 Greg Kramer
 John Krizanc
 Sunil Kuruvilla
 Andrew Kushnir

L 
 Marie Laberge
 Rosa Labordé
 Jonathan Lachlan-Stewart
 Robert Lalonde
 Ann Lambert
 Betty Lambert
 André Langevin
 Gilbert La Rocque
 Rina Lasnier
 Jesse LaVercombe
 Mishka Lavigne
 John Lazarus
 Marie-Christine Lê-Huu
 Walter Learning
 Suzanne Lebeau
 Paul Sun-Hyung Lee
 Catherine Léger
 Mark Leiren-Young
 Anne Legault
 Stewart Lemoine
 Robert Lepage
 François Létourneau
 Léo Lévesque
 Raymond Lévesque
 Georgina Lightning
 Hillar Liitoja
 Wendy Lill
 Françoise Loranger
 Kevin Loring
 Otto Lowy
 Kate Lynch

M 
 Greg MacArthur
 Andrew MacBean
 Ann-Marie MacDonald
 Bryden MacDonald
 Maggie MacDonald
 Lee MacDougall
 Matthew MacFadzean
 David Macfarlane
 Daniel MacIvor
 Cory Mack
 Isabel Mackay
 Michael Mackenzie
 Michael MacLennan
 Joan MacLeod
 Andrew Macphail
 Michèle Magny
 Gilles Maheu
 Louise Maheux-Forcier
 Antonine Maillet
 André Major
 Kevin Major
 Anita Majumdar
 Robert Majzels
 Ahdri Zhina Mandiela
 Stanley Mann
 Vera Manuel
 Barbara March
 Josephine Marchand
 Jovette Marchessault
 Robert Marinier
 Tanya Marquardt
 Alexis Martin
 Bob Martin
 Paul Nicholas Mason
 Stephen Massicotte
 Catherine Mavrikakis
 Maxim Mazumdar
 Tawiah M'carthy
 Drew McCreadie
 Kathleen McDonnell
 Peter McGehee
 Berend McKenzie
 Ian McLachlan
 Mike McLeod
 Rick McNair
 Maureen Medved
 Mary Melfi
 Billy Merasty
 Robert Merritt
 Claude Meunier
 Andrée A. Michaud
 Pauline Michel
 Marco Micone
 John Mighton
 Jean-Louis Millette
 Michael Mirolla
 Fawzia Mirza
 W. O. Mitchell
 Boonaa Mohammed
 Frank Moher
 Monique Mojica
 Émilie Monnet
 Andrew Moodie
 Ellie Moon
 Fiona Moore
 Mavor Moore
 Robert Moore
 Greg Morrison
 Kim Morrissey
 Hannah Moscovitch
 Daniel David Moses
 Arthur Motyer
 Wajdi Mouawad
 Grace Helen Mowat
 Neil Munro
 Janet Munsil
 Colleen Murphy
 Rory Mullarkey
 John Murrell

N 
 Tony Nardi
 Michael Nathanson
 Yvette Naubert
 Dan Needles
 Louis Negin
 James W. Nichol
 Eric Nicol
 Francine Noël
 Yvette Nolan
 Alden Nowlan

O 
 Darren O'Donnell
 Sean Harris Oliver
 Anne-Marie Olivier
 Leo Orenstein
 Cathy Ostlere
 Mieko Ouchi

P 
 André Paiement
 Alisa Palmer
 John Palmer
 Morris Panych
 David Paquet
 Jivesh Parasram
 Amanda Parris
 Evalyn Parry
 Ngozi Paul
 Teresa Pavlinek
 Deborah Pearson
 Howard Pechet
 Soraya Peerbaye
 Maryse Pelletier
 Len Peterson
 Pierre Petitclair
 Adam Pettle
 M. NourbeSe Philip
 Marjorie Pickthall
 Joseph Jomo Pierre
 Gordon Pinsent
 Jean-Paul Pinsonneault
 Lorraine Pintal
 Al Pittman
 Richard Pochinko
 Sharon Pollock
 Helen Fogwill Porter
 Paul David Power
 Peter Pringle
 Stefan Psenak

Q 
 Joseph Quesnel
 Sina Queyras
 Christine Quintana

R 
 Gyllian Raby
 Lara Rae
 Gord Rand
 Karin Randoja
 James Reaney
 Kelly Rebar
 Michael Redhill
 Kim Renders
 Sean Reycraft
 Charlie Rhindress
 Christopher Richards
 Jael Richardson
 Gwen Pharis Ringwood
 Harry Rintoul
 Erika Ritter
 William Harris Lloyd Roberts
 Marie-Colombe Robichaud
 Ajmer Rode
 Michael E. Rose
 Ian Ross
 Vittorio Rossi (Little Blood Brother, Backstreets, The Chain, The Last Adam, Paradise By The River, A Carpenter's Trilogy)
 Anusree Roy
Baņuta Rubess
 Saul Rubinek
 Armand Garnet Ruffo
 Rusty Ryan
 George Ryga

S 
 Oren Safdie
 Donna-Michelle St. Bernard
 Rick Salutin (1837, Les Canadiens)
 Kat Sandler (Mustard)
 Irene Sankoff
 Booth Savage
 Marie Savard
 Emmanuel Schwartz
 Munroe Scott
 Djanet Sears (Harlem Duet, The Adventures of a Black Girl in Search of God)
 Adam Seelig
 Lorraine Segato
 Goh Poh Seng
 Sandra Shamas (My Boyfriend's Back and There's Gonna Be Laundry)
 Jason Sherman (The League of Nathans, Reading Hebron)
 Erin Shields (If We Were Birds)
 Tetsuro Shigematsu
 Rick Shiomi
 Reuben Ship
 Alfred Silver
 Beverley Rosen Simons
 Lister Sinclair
 Jaspreet Singh (Speak, Oppenheimer)
 Pamela Mala Sinha (Crash, Happy Place)
 Christine Sioui-Wawanoloath
 Sonja Skarstedt
 Bernard Slade
 Annabel Soutar
 Ron Sparks
 Harry Standjofski
 Kate Sterns
 Kent Stetson (The Harps of God, Warm Wind in China)
 Aurora Stewart de Peña
 Raymond Storey (The Saints and Apostles, The Glorious 12th)
 Allan Stratton (Rexy!, 72 Under the O)
 Cordelia Strube
 Addena Sumter-Freitag
 Olivier Sylvestre

T 
 Mariko Tamaki
 Ian Tamblyn
 Jordan Tannahill
 Drew Hayden Taylor
 Deanne Taylor
 Bobby Theodore
 Vern Thiessen
 Colin Thomas
 Andy Thompson (Broken Sex Doll, The Birth of Freedom)
 Judith Thompson
 Paul Thompson
 Peggy Thompson
 Scott Thompson
 Kristen Thomson (I, Claudia)
 Shannon Thunderbird
 Sara Tilley
 Jackie Torrens
 Paul Toupin
 Theresa Tova
 Jennifer Tremblay
 Larry Tremblay (The Dragonfly of Chicoutimi)
 Lise Tremblay
 Michel Tremblay (Les Belles-sœurs, Albertine in Five Times)
 Roland Michel Tremblay
 Terry Tweed

U
 Priscila Uppal
 Geoffrey Ursell

V 
 Lise Vaillancourt
 Guy Vanderhaeghe
 R. M. Vaughan
 Royce Vavrek
 Guillermo Verdecchia
 Mary Vingoe
 Padma Viswanathan
 Herman Voaden

W 
 Michael Wade
 Colleen Wagner
 Stephen Waldschmidt
 Craig Walker
 George F. Walker
 Tom Walmsley
 Agnes Walsh
 Chris Ward
 Dianne Warren
 David Watmough
 Wilfred Watson
 Irene N. Watts
 Alison Wearing
Jennifer Wynne Webber
 Helen Weinzweig
 Michael Wex
 David Widdicombe
 Randall Wiebe
 Gina Wilkinson
 Alan Williams
 Kenneth T. Williams
 Laakkuluk Williamson Bathory
 Jonathan Wilson
 Lance Woolaver
 Rachel Wyatt
 Betty Jane Wylie

Y 
 J. Michael Yates
 David Yee (lady in the red dress)
 Michael Yerxa
 Jean Yoon
 d'bi young
 David Young
 Josée Yvon

References 

Canadian

Playwrights